Salon 94 is an art gallery in New York City owned by Jeanne Greenberg Rohatyn.

History

East 94th Street
The gallery opened in 2003 in the Carnegie Hill neighborhood on New York City’s Upper East Side as an integral part of Jeanne Greenberg Rohatyn’s home. Designed by architect Rafael Viñoly, the gallery features a dedicated exhibition space on the first floor and a combination living/gallery space on the second.  The inaugural exhibition presented a video work by gallery artist Aïda Ruilova.
Subsequent exhibitions have featured work by Betty Woodman, Maya Lin, Wangechi Mutu, Hanna Liden and Nate Lowman.

Salon 94 Freemans
In 2007, the gallery opened an additional location on New York’s Lower East Side at Freemans Alley as a dedicated exhibition space.  The first exhibition featured work by gallery artist Huma Bhabha and subsequent shows have featured Lorna Simpson, Carter, Barry X Ball, Kara Hamilton and Lynda Benglis.

Salon 94 Bowery
In October 2010, the gallery opened a third location on the Bowery on New York’s Lower East Side. Located two doors down from the New Museum, the space was also designed by architect Rafael Viñoly as a dedicated exhibition venue. A prominent feature of the gallery is a  LCD video screen on the outside wall broadcasting video art content to the street.

The inaugural show presented work gallery artist Liz Cohen. Subsequent shows featured Marilyn Minter, Laurie Simmons, Jon Kessler, Francesca Dimattio, Lisa Brice and David Benjamin Sherry. During the construction phase, the gallery presented T-shirt paintings by Richard Prince.

East 89th Street
In 2019, Greenberg Rohatyn acquired three buildings that made up the former National Academy Museum on East 89th Street – a  property – which will be Salon 94's new headquarters.

Artists
Artists represented by Salon 94 include:
Marina Adams
Estate of Terry Adkins
Amy Bessone
Huma Bhabha
Judy Chicago (since 2016)
Liu Chuang
Liz Cohen
Estate of Jimmy DeSana
Francesca DiMattio
Ibrahim El-Salahi
Sylvie Fleury
Natalie Frank (since 2019)
Katy Grannan
Lyle Ashton Harris (since 2017)
Jon Kessler
Takuro Kuwata
Marilyn Minter
Estate of Carlo Mollino
Takeshi Murata
Jayson Musson
Ruby Neri (since 2018)
Rick Owens
Carlos Rolón/DZINE
David Benjamin Sherry
Warlimpirrnga Tjapaltjarri
Betty Woodman

References

External links
Salon 94 Official Web Site

Art museums and galleries in Manhattan